Pascal Castillo (born 16 July 1976) is a Swiss football (soccer) defender who is now retired.

During his career, Castillo played for FC Zürich, Lausanne Sports, FC Winterthur, Grasshoppers Zürich, FC Luzern, SC Young Fellows Juventus, FC Regensdorf and FC Blue Stars Zürich.

External links

1976 births
Living people
Swiss men's footballers
FC Zürich players
FC Lausanne-Sport players
FC Winterthur players
Grasshopper Club Zürich players
FC Luzern players
SC Young Fellows Juventus players
Association football defenders